Phoebe Hemenway Legere is a multi-disciplinary artist.
She is a Juilliard-educated composer, soprano, pianist and accordionist, painter, poet, and a film maker.  A graduate of Vassar College with a four octave vocal range, Legere has recorded for Mercury Records in England, and for Epic, Island, Rizzoli, Funtone, ESP Disk and Einstein Records in the United States. Legere plays seven musical instruments and has released 15 CDs of original music.  She has appeared on National Public Radio, CBS Sunday Morning, PBS's City Arts, WNYC's Soundcheck, Charlie Rose and in films by Troma, Island Pictures, Rosa von Praunheim, Ela Troyano and Ivan Galietti, Abel Ferrara, Jonathan Demme, Ivan Reitman and many others. Legere is of Acadian and Abenaki descent through her father. She is a standard bearer of the Acadian and Abenaki renaissance in America.

History 
Legere's parents were both artists.  She began piano lessons at age 3, and learned the techniques of oil painting and draftsmanship when she was age 5, and by age 9 was a professional musician. She has never taken a singing lesson.
She had her debut at Carnegie Hall at age 16.

As the opening act for David Bowie on his 1990 Sound+Vision Tour US tour, Legere played her original songs for 20,000 people a night.  A huge forklift brought a white grand piano to the stage, where she performed with her seminal punk-rock band, the Four Nurses of the Apocalypse.

In 2000, with composer Morgan Powell, she co-wrote The Waterclown – a musical setting of her epic poem about water issues, "The Waterclown" – for the Cleveland Chamber Symphony.

Beginning in 2001, Legere worked as Head Writer, on-air host, and interviewer for Roulette TV, a collection of video programs broadcast online and on New York City cable television,
that captures the creative process of live performance at "the extreme frontier edge of art and music" and is dedicated to experimental art and music.
Legere's musical invention the Sneakers of Samothrace were the subject of one episode of the program on 9 December 2007. She was interviewed afterward by David Behrman, an American composer and pioneer of computer music, revealing that her first job was resident composer for The Wooster Group
and discussing in detail their influence on her art making.

Legere is Founder and archivist for the New York Underground Museum (founded 2006).

In 2013, she created The Shamancycle, a four-wheeled alternative vehicle designed in the form of a moving giant eagle sculpture constructed from repurposed metal and powered by alternative energy and having room for 15 people, the idea for which came to her in a dream.

In 2015, Legere appeared on It's Me, Hilary: The Man Who Drew Eloise, an HBO documentary produced by Lena Dunham about Hilary Knight who is best known as the illustrator of Kay Thompson's Eloise series of children's books.

Legere was touring again in 2017,
bringing art and music to the children in low income communities on behalf of her nonprofit Foundation for New American Art, founded in 2016.

Legere, who has Native American heritage, has been an outspoken advocate for female, gay, Native American, and universal civil rights. She will represent North America at Cannes 2018.

She wrote and starred in the play Speed Queen: The Joe Carstairs Story, performing as multiple characters in a musical about the life of Marion Barbara 'Joe' Carstairs (1900-1993), the wealthy British power boat racer known for her speed and eccentric lifestyle. The production combined storytelling, painting, sculpture, movie stars, costumes, and music.
Legere performed this transdisciplinary play seven times between March 7 and March 24, 2018, at Dixon Place, in the main performance space of the New York City theater organization dedicated to the development of artwork from a broad range of performers and artists.

Personal life 
Legere is gender-fluid.

Discography 
 Trust Me, 1986, Epic Records
 Marilyn Monroe, 1989, Island Records
 Phoebe Legere, 1993, Ripe & Ready/Dead Dog Records
 Six Flights Up,1995, Funtone Records
 Four Nurses of the Apocalypse, 1995, Mysterious Ways
 1000 Kisses,1996, Funtone Records
 Last Tango In Bubbleland, 1997, Random Records
 Blue Curtain, 2000, Einstein Records
 Blind Pursuits, 2001 (with Jim Staley and Borah Bergman), Einstein Records
 Children of the Dawn, 2007 (with Ken Little Hawk), Mysterious Ways
 The Common Root of All Organisms, 2007 (with Morgan Powell and the Tone Road Ramblers),  Einstein Records
 The Prairie, 2007 (with Morgan Powell and the Tone Road Ramblers), Einstein Records
 The Imaginary Opera, DVD 2008, Einstein Records (Compilation with Kathy Supové, Oliver Lake)
 Ultra Romantic Parallel Universe, 2009 (with Leo Abrahams), Unrest Cure, Mercury Records
 Dark Energy, 2009 (with Eric Mandat and the Tone Road Ramblers), Einstein Records
 Ooh La La Coq Tail, 2010, Mysterious Ways
 Earth Singing World, 2010, ESP Disk
 East Village/East Berlin 2013, Mysterious Ways
 Acadian Moon, 2015, Big Moose Records
 Heart of Love, 2017

Plays 

 In 2001, Legere received a NYSCA grant to write The Queen of New England, an experimental multimedia opera about the Massachusetts Native American Holocaust.
 Her musical, Hello Mrs. President, about the first African American woman president of the United States played four times in New York City.  In 1991, the first woman president was played by Rock and Roll Hall of Fame star LaVerne Baker.
 Her musical, Shakespeare and Elizabeth, about the life of Elizabeth l, premiered at Theater for the New City on December 5, 2013.
 Speed Queen, performed in March 2018.

Filmography 

 Mondo New York (1988)
 The Toxic Avenger Part II (1989)
 The Toxic Avenger Part III: The Last Temptation of Toxie (1989)
 King of New York (1990)
 Sgt. Kabukiman N.Y.P.D. (1991)
 Le Marquis de Slime (1997)
 The Bar Channel (1998)
 Sin City Spectacular (Episode #1.16)
 The Naked Brothers Band (2007) Nickelodeon, Dir. Polly Draper
 Wie ich lernte, die Zahlen zu lieben/How I Learned to Love the Numbers (2014) by Oliver Sechting & Max Taubert

See also
List of people in Playboy 1980–1989

References

External links 
 Official Music Site
 Paintings, Drawings, SoundArt by Phoebe Legere
 The Shamancycle by Phoebe Legere
 

American cabaret performers
American women painters
American women composers
Living people
American stage actresses
American people of French-Canadian descent
American women singer-songwriters
American women dramatists and playwrights
American people of Acadian descent
Vassar College alumni
American film actresses
American television actresses
21st-century American actresses
21st-century American writers
21st-century American composers
Artists from New York City
Performance art in New York City
21st-century American women writers
Singer-songwriters from New York (state)
Singers with a four-octave vocal range
American LGBT rights activists
1963 births
21st-century American women musicians
21st-century women composers
Feminist musicians
Non-binary musicians